Doris Lake is a natural body of water in the Three Sisters Wilderness of the central Cascade Range in the U.S. state of Oregon.

Doris Lake is west-southwest of Blow Lake and Elk Lake in the Deschutes National Forest. Other nearby lakes include Senoj and Leech. Doris Lake lies slightly east of the Lane County border and the Mink Lake Basin.

No perennial streams enter or leave the lake, which is thought to gain and lose water through seepage.

Recreation
The Six Lakes Trail, which runs by Doris Lake, connects the scenic byway to the east with the Pacific Crest Trail to the west. The trail offers opportunities for day hikes, backpacking, and horse riding.

Brook trout, stocked annually in the lake, grow to  here. Fishing is said to be "fair". Much of the lake is difficult to fish without a raft or float tube brought in along the trail.

See also
 List of lakes in Oregon

References

External links
Visit Doris for a Day – The Bulletin (Bend) (Jun 25, 2009)
Additional articles about the lake The Bulletin (Bend)

Deschutes National Forest
Lakes of Oregon
Lakes of Deschutes County, Oregon